Loose Walk is a live album by American saxophonist Dexter Gordon recorded at the Jazzhus Montmartre in Copenhagen, Denmark in 1965 by Danmarks Radio and released on the SteepleChase label in 2005.

Critical reception 

JazzTimes reviewer Chris Kelsey stated "Gordon’s playing is loose and relaxed, bluesy and intense. Drew is superb; NHOP and Riel do their duty. Dex’s idiosyncratic spoken intros to tunes like “I Should Care” and “Come Rain or Come Shine” are charming, and the gritty soulfulness of his playing reminds us just how much we miss the greats of his generation. They don’t make ’em like this anymore".

Track listing 
 "There Will Never Be Another You" (Harry Warren, Mack Gordon) – 13:31
 Introduction – 0:17
 "Come Rain or Come Shine" (Harold Arlen, Johnny Mercer) – 14:17
 Introduction – 0:37
 "I Should Care" (Axel Stordahl, Sammy Cahn, Paul Weston) – 10:56
 Introduction – 0:39
 "Loose Walk" (Sonny Stitt) – 7:08

Source:

Personnel 
Dexter Gordon – tenor saxophone
Kenny Drew – piano
Niels-Henning Ørsted Pedersen – bass
Alex Riel – drums

Source:

References 

SteepleChase Records live albums
Dexter Gordon live albums
2003 live albums
Albums recorded at Jazzhus Montmartre